Feliks Undusk (born 23 December 1948 in Kärdla, Hiiu County) is an Estonian journalist and politician. He was a member of VIII Riigikogu.

References

Living people
1948 births
Estonian journalists
Estonian Reform Party politicians
Members of the Riigikogu, 1995–1999
Recipients of the Order of the National Coat of Arms, 4th Class
Tallinn University of Technology alumni
People from Kärdla